Mickaël Bourgain (born 28 May 1980 in Boulogne-sur-Mer) is a French track cyclist, who won a bronze medal in the men's team sprint race at the 2004 Summer Olympics in Athens together with Laurent Gané and Arnaud Tournant, and a bronze medal in the men's individual sprint at the 2008 Summer Olympics.

Major results

2002
2nd Team Sprint, World Cup, Sydney
3rd Sprint, World Cup, Sydney

2003
2nd Keirin, French National Track Championships
2nd Sprint, French National Track Championships
2nd Team Sprint, UCI Track World Championships
1st Sprint, World Cup, Cape Town
1st Kilo, French National Track Championships, Hyères

2004
1st Team Sprint, UCI Track World Championships
1st Keirin, World Cup, Aguascalientes
1st Team sprint, World Cup, Aguascalientes
1st Sprint, World Cup, Aguascalientes
1st Keirin, French National Track Championships, Hyères
3rd Sprint, French National Track Championships, Hyères
3rd Team Sprint, Olympic Games, Athens

2005
3rd Team sprint, World Cup, Los Angeles
1st Sprint, World Cup, Los Angeles
2nd Keirin, World Cup, Manchester
1st Sprint, World Cup, Manchester
2nd Sprint, UCI Track World Championships, Los Angeles
2nd Sprint, French National Track Championships, Hyères
1st Keirin, French National Track Championships, Hyères
3rd Sprint, World Cup, Manchester

2006
2nd Sprint, World Cup, Los Angeles
1st Team Sprint, World Cup, Los Angeles
1st Team Sprint, UCI Track World Championships, Bordeaux
3rd Keirin, French National Track Championships, Hyères
3rd Keirin, World Cup, Moscow
3rd Team Sprint, World Cup, Moscow

2007
3rd Sprint, World Cup, Manchester
1st Team Sprint, UCI Track World Championships, Palma de Mallorca
3rd Sprint, UCI Track World Championships, Palma de Mallorca
3rd Sprint, French National Track Championships
1st Sprint, World Cup, Sydney
2nd Sprint, World Cup, Beijing

2008
2nd Team sprint, World Cup, Los Angeles

References

External links
profile

1980 births
Living people
People from Boulogne-sur-Mer
French male cyclists
Cyclists at the 2004 Summer Olympics
Cyclists at the 2008 Summer Olympics
Cyclists at the 2012 Summer Olympics
Olympic cyclists of France
Olympic bronze medalists for France
Olympic medalists in cycling
Medalists at the 2008 Summer Olympics
Officers of the Ordre national du Mérite
UCI Track Cycling World Champions (men)
Medalists at the 2004 Summer Olympics
French track cyclists
Sportspeople from Pas-de-Calais
Cyclists from Hauts-de-France
21st-century French people